Tyger, also known as  heraldic tiger or tygre, is an imaginary beast used as a charge in heraldry.

Name
To distinguish it from the naturally existing tiger, which also occurs in heraldry, the latter is usually blazoned as a "Bengal tiger".

Description
The tyger's body is like that of the real tiger, but lacks stripes. It has the tufted tail of a lion and a thick mane along the neck like a horse. It has large jaws and a pointed or even horned snout, and its head bears little resemblance to that of any real animal except, distantly, the wolf's. A tyger proper was in medieval times said to be speckled, later red.

History
As real tigers were unknown to early British heraldists, depictions of this creature were drawn from artists' ideas of this creature that they knew only through secondhand accounts. Consequently, although it originated as an attempt to depict a real creature, the heraldic tyger eventually became highly distinct from the original animal. When real tigers became better known to Europeans, notably through the colonization of India, they began to be depicted in heraldry alongside the traditional heraldic tyger.

Mythology
It is supposed to have its home in Hyrcania in Persia and its swiftness is supposed to have given its name to "tygris", the Persian word for "arrow", and to the swift River Tigris. 

If pursued by a tyger, it was supposed to be possible to get away from it by leaving a mirror, which would perplex the tyger, or entrance it in admiration of its own beauty. As a result, tygers are sometimes depicted looking in a mirror.

See also
 The Tyger

References
Fictitious and symbolic creatures in art

Heraldic beasts
Mythological hybrids
Mythological felines